The Cloth Act 1337 (11 Edw. 3, c. 2) was an Act of the Parliament of England passed during the reign of Edward III.

The Act legally obliged all English people to wear English-made cloth. It was part of a group of Sumptuary Laws intended to preserve class distinctions.

Notes

Acts of the Parliament of England
1330s in law
1337 in England
Protectionism